E.S.M.Packeer Mohamed is an Indian politician, he belongs to Indian National Congress party, he is elected Member of Legislative Assembly in 1980-1984 and Member of parliament,Lok Sabha in 1984-1989 from Mayiladuthurai, Tamil Nadu

Early life 
PACKEER MOHAMED is an son of Janab E.Sheik Mydeen Rowther, born in Kumbakonam, Thanjavur at April 28, 1937, education at Native Matric High School, Kumbakonam, Tamil Nadu, he married Razya Banu on January 21, 1960,he have 1 son and 3 daughters, Industrialist.

Previous association with political parties 
President of Congess in Kumbakonam, Tamil Nadu,1967–70

Previous membership 
Eighth Lok Sabha in 1984–89; Legislative Assembly, Tamil Nadu in 1980–84;

Committee experience 
Member of Consultative Committee, Ministry of Finance, 1985–89, Ministry of Surface Transport, 1990;

Delegation to foreign countries 
Member of Government of India Haj Goodwill Mission to Mecca and Medina;

Social activities 
President of Mydeen Memorial Charitable Association, Kumbakonam; President of District Muslim Education Society, Thanjavur.

Other information 
Vice-president, Mylapore Academy, Madras, Correspondent of Native H.S. School, Kumbakonam and Mydeen Matriculation School, Memberof Indian Cashewnut Development Council, 1986–89.

References 

20th-century Indian politicians
Indian National Congress politicians